Mount San Cristobal is a potentially active stratovolcano  at the boundary of the provinces of Laguna and Quezon on the island of Luzon, Philippines.

Mount San Cristobal is considered the Devil's Mountain in Filipino folklore. It is the alter-ego of the Holy Mountain, Mount Banahaw, and is part of Mounts Banahaw–San Cristobal Protected Landscape, covering 10,901 hectares (26,940 acres) of land.

The mountain is bordered by San Pablo, province of Laguna at its northern slope and Dolores, province of Quezon at its southern slope.

See also
List of mountains in the Philippines
List of national parks of the Philippines

References

External links

Mountains of the Philippines
Volcanoes of Luzon
Complex volcanoes
Sacred mountains
Landforms of Quezon
Landforms of Laguna (province)
Stratovolcanoes of the Philippines
Potentially active volcanoes of the Philippines